Anthony Brendan Byrne (2 February 1946 –  13 June 2016) was an Irish professional footballer. He won a total of 14 caps for the Republic of Ireland and during his career from 1963 to 1978 played for Millwall, Southampton, Hereford United and Newport County. He was originally a midfield player who switched to left-back and he had a career total of 229 league games scoring 4 goals.

Early life
He was born in Rathdowney, County Laois, Ireland, on 2 February 1946. His early sporting background was in hurling before he emigrated to London with his parents at the age of 12.

Playing career
He began his career as a footballer at Millwall, where he was originally a midfield player before switching to left-back. After only one appearance for Millwall, he was signed by Ted Bates for Southampton for a fee of £8,000 in August 1964. Although he made his Saints debut in an FA Cup tie against Crystal Palace in January 1965, Byrne took a long time to break into the Southampton first team, mainly because of a broken leg sustained in a reserve team match in April 1966. He eventually overcame this setback to make his league debut on 18 April 1967 in front of a 54,921 crowd at Old Trafford as relegation-threatened Saints went down 3–0 to Manchester United. He was slightly built for a defender and "although quick and diligent, he struggled to carve a permanent niche in Southampton's notoriously robust rearguard".

His best season with The Saints was 1969–70, in which he made 35 league appearances, playing in defence alongside Joe Kirkup and John McGrath, as Saints again  fought to avoid relegation. He scored his first league goal in the final match of the season in a 1–1 draw against Derby County. Having given away Derby's 88th-minute goal after a poor back-pass, Byrne quickly turned from villain to hero as he slotted in a bobbling ball in the 90th minute in a dramatic climax to the season.

He stayed at The Dell for ten years during which time he made a total of 114 first team appearances and won 14 Irish caps.

In August 1974 he moved to Hereford United to join former Saints' colleague Terry Paine for three seasons before finishing his career with Newport County.

Amazingly his Irish international debut in October 1969 in Dublin against Denmark was the first time he had kicked a ball in his native land because he had emigrated to London with his parents at the age of 12 and, until then, had played only hurling.

After retiring from football, he worked as a foreman at Hereford golf course before working as a builder for EC Joseph & Sons LTD in Hereford. He died on 13 June 2016, aged 70.

References

External links
 Republic of Ireland profile

1946 births
2016 deaths
Association footballers from County Laois
Republic of Ireland association footballers
Republic of Ireland international footballers
English Football League players
Hereford United F.C. players
Millwall F.C. players
Newport County A.F.C. players
Southampton F.C. players
Association football fullbacks